Voivodeship Road 102 (abbreviated DW 102) is a route in the Polish voivodeship roads network. It runs through the north of the West Pomeranian Voivodeship leading from Misdroy, and into Kołobrzeg where it meets the National Road 11 and Voivodeship Road 163.

Major cities and towns along the route 

Misdroy
Wisełka
Międzywodzie
Dziwnów
Dziwnówek
Pobierowo
Rewal
Lędzin
Trzebiatów
Kołobrzeg

References

102